Bayside Airport was an airfield operational  from at least 1938 to 1941. The airfield was located alongside Hingham Bay in Hingham, Massachusetts. Following the Attack on Pearl Harbor, the land was appropriated into the Bethlehem Hingham Shipyard, which produced destroyer escorts in tandem with Fore River Shipyard until 1945.

References

Defunct airports in Massachusetts
Airports in Plymouth County, Massachusetts